Yaovi Aziabou (born 11 September 1990) is a Togolese former professional footballer who played as a defender. He made one appearance for the Togo national team in 2010.

Club career
Born in Lomé, Aziabou began his career with Planète Foot and in 2004 joined the youth team of FC Toulouse. On 4 January 2010, after two and a half years in the reserve team of Toulouse, he signed with French fifth-tier side Jeunesse Sportive Cugnalaise.

International career
Aziabou earned his first call up for the Togo national team on 14 November 2008 and made his debut in the Corsica Cup on 21 May 2010 against Gabon.

References

1990 births
Living people
Togolese footballers
Togo international footballers
Togo youth international footballers
Association football midfielders
Championnat National 2 players
Toulouse FC players
Tarbes Pyrénées Football players
Toulouse Fontaines Club players
Expatriate footballers in France
Togolese expatriate sportspeople in France
Togolese expatriate footballers
21st-century Togolese people